The 2009–10 Elitserien was the 76th season of the top division of Swedish handball. 14 teams competed in the league. The eight highest placed teams qualified for the playoffs, whereas teams 11–13 had to play relegation playoffs against teams from the second division, and team 14 was relegated automatically. IK Sävehof won the regular season and also won the playoffs to claim their third Swedish title.

League table

Playoffs

Group stage

Group 1

Bonus points: IK Sävehof 3, Ystads IF 2, Hammarby IF 1

Group 2

Bonus points: Alingsås HK 3, IF Guif 2, HK Drott 1

Semifinals

Sävehof–Guif 33–23
Guif–Sävehof 28–30
Sävehof–Guif 33–27
Sävehof won series 3–0

Ystads IF–Drott 27–30
Drott–Ystads IF 24–29
Ystads IF–Drott 28–27
Drott–Ystads IF 26–25
Ystads IF–Drott 27–34
Drott won series 3–2

Final

Sävehof–Drott 30–28 a.e.t.

Attendance

References 

Swedish handball competitions